Ypäjä is a municipality located in the countryside of South-Western Finland. It belongs to the province of Southern Finland and the region of Tavastia Proper. The municipality has a population of 
which 
is water. The population density is
. The municipality is unilingually Finnish.

The main population centre of Ypäjä is a small village situated on the river Loimijoki, between the towns of Forssa (23 km to the east from Ypäjä) and Loimaa (15 km to the west). Although officially part of the Forssa region, Ypäjä is often also considered to belong to the Loimaa region as it has traditionally been influenced by both towns. Besides Loimaa, its direct neighbours are Jokioinen, Humppila, Somero and Koski Tl.

Ypäjä is probably best known for horses; the municipality e.g. has an Equine College and hosts an annual international riding competition called Finnderby.

Ypäjä's coat of arms is designed by Aukusti Tuhka.

References

External links 

Municipality of Ypäjä – Official website 
Equine College Ypäjä

Municipalities of Kanta-Häme
Populated places established in 1876
1876 establishments in Finland